Bessvatnet is a glacial lake in Vågå Municipality in Innlandet county, Norway. The  lake is located in the Jotunheimen mountain range and also inside the Jotunheimen National Park. The lake lies just east of the mountain Besshø. The lake Bessvatnet is known to everyone that has hiked the Besseggen ridge, as the narrow mountain ridge runs between the southern end of the dark blue lake Bessvatnet on one side of the ridge and the green lake Gjende lies below the other side of the ridge.

Name 
Bessvatnet is named after the river Bessa. The last element is the finite form of vatn which means 'water' or 'lake'. The name of the river is derived from Old Norse word bersi which means 'bear' thus the river name means 'Bear river'.

See also
List of lakes in Norway

References

Vågå
Lakes of Innlandet